Mount Armagost is one in the series of peaks (2,040 m) that rise between Mirabito Range and Homerun Range in northern Victoria Land, Antarctica. This peak stands 9 nautical miles (17 km) southwest of Mount LeResche. The geographical feature was mapped by United States Geological Survey (USGS) from surveys and U.S. Navy air photos, 1960–63. Named by Advisory Committee on Antarctic Names (US-ACAN) for Chief Equipment Operator Harry M. Armagost, U.S. Navy, who wintered over at McMurdo Station in 1963 and 1967. The mountain lies on the Pennell Coast, a portion of Antarctica lying between Cape Williams and Cape Adare.

Mountains of Victoria Land
Pennell Coast